The 1965 Summer Universiade, also known as the IV Summer Universiade, took place in Budapest, Hungary.

Sports at the 1965 Summer Universiade
 Athletics
 Basketball
 Diving
 Fencing
 Gymnastics
 Swimming
 Tennis
 Volleyball
 Water polo

Medal table

 
1965
U
International sports competitions in Budapest
Summer Universiade, 1965
Multi-sport events in Hungary
1960s in Budapest
August 1965 sports events in Europe